Aeronord was an airline based in Moldova, founded in 2006.

References

Defunct airlines of Moldova
Airlines established in 2006
Airlines disestablished in 2007